Broken Hive Records is an Australian independent record label based in Sydney. The label caters predominantly for hardcore bands, although have released music and booked tours for bands that cross over into punk rock and metal. Broken Hive was formed by toy, who "will continue his work in hardcore music by booking international and local tours, managing and booking local bands, as well as releasing and distributing a variety of titles through the label." In 2011 the label released an extended play, Dream Strong by Sydney band Endless Heights. Since then the label has expanded to release records by many well known Australian hardcore bands, and is one of the go-to labels for fans of the hardcore genre.

Broken Hive also book shows and tours for both Australian and international bands, previous tours include Backtrack, Iron Mind, Trapped Under Ice, Xibalba, Basement, Harms Way and Endless Heights.

The label achieved wider attention with the announcement of a tour for American band Trapped Under Ice in 2012. As part of the tour the band would headline a new Melbourne based hardcore festival called Break The Ice. The festival, run by Broken Hive, has since become an integral part of the Australian hardcore calendar attracting hundreds of punters each year.

Label roster

Current

Apart From This
Dreamtigers
Endless Heights
Flowermouth
Harbourer
Machina Genova
Marathon
Monuments
Remembering Never
Trainwreck

Alumni

Civil War
Phantoms
Postblue
Thorns

Releases

References

External links
 archived from the original on 8 May 2016. Retrieved 24 October 2017.

Australian independent record labels
Hardcore record labels
Record labels based in Melbourne
Record labels established in 2011
Record labels based in Sydney